Dendropsophus cerradensis is a species of frogs in the family Hylidae.

It is endemic to Brazil. Its natural habitats are moist savanna, subtropical or tropical moist shrubland, freshwater marshes, and intermittent freshwater marshes. It is threatened by habitat loss.

Sources

cerradensis
Endemic fauna of Brazil
Amphibians described in 1998
Taxonomy articles created by Polbot